The Baotou–Xi'an railway is a railway line in China.

History
The first section of the railway, between Baotou and Ordos, opened on 26 December 2009. The remaining section, between Ordos and Xi'an, opened on 28 December 2010.

Future
The southern section of this line, between Yan'an and Xi'an, will be bypassed by the Xi'an–Yan'an high-speed railway, currently under construction.

References

Railway lines in China
Railway lines opened in 2009